Ingrid I. Willoch  (8 October 1943 – 23 November 2017) was a Norwegian politician. 

She was born in Oslo to Finn Isaachsen Willoch and Kaja Beck. She was elected representative to the Storting for the period 1981–1985 for the Conservative Party. She was reelected for the period 1985–1989. She died on 23 November 2017 at the age of 74.

References

1943 births
2017 deaths
Politicians from Oslo
Conservative Party (Norway) politicians
Women members of the Storting